Racey is a British pop group.

Racey may also refer to:

 Racey Helps (1913–1970), English children's author and illustrator. 
 Paul Racey, professor of natural history at the University of Aberdeen. 
 George Racey Jordan (1898-1966) American military officer.

See also
 Racy (disambiguation)